Mohsenabad (also Romanized as Moḩsenābād; also known as Ādarmanāābād, Ādarmanābād, Ādarmonāābād, and Adermanābād) is a village in Borkhar-e Markazi Rural District, in the Central District of Borkhar County, Isfahan Province, Iran. At the 2006 census, its population was 3,074, in 781 families.

References 

Populated places in Borkhar County